The position of the Head of the Republic of Mordovia (formerly known as the President of the Republic of Mordovia) is the highest office within the Government of the Republic of Mordovia in Russia. The Head is elected by citizens of Russia residing in the republic. Term of service is five years.

History 
The post of the Head of Mordovia was introduced in 1995. Before that (1991–93) the President of Mordovia was the highest official of the Republic. In December 1991, Vasily Guslyannikov was elected as the first and last President of Mordovia. In 1993, the Supreme Soviet of Mordovia removed him and abolished this position following Guslyannikov's accusation of abuse and corruption brought by the MPs headed by the speaker and ex-candidate for the presidency Nikolay Biryukov. The Council of Ministers, headed by Valery Shvetsov, was created as the governing body of Mordovia.

In November 1995, elections to the State Assembly of Mordovia and local self-government took place. In January 1995 Nikolay Merkushkin, former leader of Mordovian Komsomol branch, became the Chairman of the State Assembly. On 22 September 1995 the Constitutional Assembly elected him as the Head of the Republic.

List

References

External links
Russian republics

Heads of the Republic of Mordovia
Politics of Mordovia
Mordovia